Air Marshal Graeme Alan Robertson,  (born 22 February 1945) is a former Royal Air Force commander who after retirement worked for BAE Systems.

RAF career
Robertson joined the Royal Air Force in 1966. He was appointed Officer Commanding No. 92 Squadron flying Phantoms in Germany in 1982 and then Officer Commanding No. 23 Squadron flying Phantoms over the Falkland Islands in 1984. He was then made Station Commander at RAF Wattisham in 1985, Director of Air Staff Briefing and Co-ordination at the Ministry of Defence in 1987 and Director of Defence Programmes at the Ministry of Defence in 1990.

He went on to be Deputy Commander of RAF Germany in 1991, Air Officer Commanding No. 2 Group in 1993 and Assistant Chief of Defence Staff (Programmes) at the Ministry of Defence in 1994 before taking up his last appointment as Chief of Staff and Deputy Commander-in-Chief at Strike Command in 1996; he retired in 1998.

He became an advisor to BAE Systems in March 1999 and is author of a paper entitled "Developments in UK Aviation" published in 2003.

References

|-

|-

1945 births
Living people
Royal Air Force air marshals
Commanders of the Order of the British Empire
Recipients of the Commendation for Valuable Service in the Air